Al Logan is an American football coach.  He served as the head football coach at Sewanee: The University of the South from 1994 to 1995 and  Muskingum University from 2007 to 2017. Logan also was an assistant coach at John Carroll University from 1983 to 1984, at Sewanee from 1985 to 1993 and again from 1996 to 1998, at Davidson College from 1999 to 2003 and at Wittenberg University from 2004 to 2006 prior to taking a position as offensive coordinator at Muskingum in 2016.  During his tenure as head coach with Muskingum, opponents were 73–6 (.924) against Al Logan when scoring 21 or more points. The Muskies were only 2–57 (.033) under Logan when playing Ohio Athletic Conference teams that finished with winning records in the conference: Ohio Northern in 2008 and 2011.

Head coaching record

References

Year of birth missing (living people)
Living people
American football offensive linemen
Davidson Wildcats football coaches
John Carroll Blue Streaks football coaches
Muskingum Fighting Muskies football coaches
Muskingum Fighting Muskies football players
Sewanee Tigers football coaches
Wittenberg Tigers football coaches